Richard Krajicek was the defending champion, but lost in the semifinals to Jan Siemerink.

Jan Siemerink won in the final 7–6(7–2), 6–2, against Thomas Johansson.

Seeds

  Patrick Rafter (quarterfinals)
  Jonas Björkman (first round)
  Greg Rusedski (quarterfinals)
  Yevgeny Kafelnikov (first round)
  Richard Krajicek (semifinals)
  Sergi Bruguera (second round)
  Goran Ivanišević (first round)
  (withdrew)

Draw

Finals

Top half

Bottom half

External links
 Draw

Singles
1998 ATP Tour